Todd Sampson is a Canadian-born Australian award-winning documentary-maker and television presenter. He appears as a co-host on the marketing discussion program Gruen and as a guest host on The Project. He wrote, produced and presented the science documentary series, Redesign My Brain which won Documentary of the Year. He is the host and producer of the ABC documentary series, Life on the Line. Sampson also writes, produces and hosts Body Hack, an adventure documentary series for Discovery International and Channel TEN which was nominated for Best Factual Series and Most Outstanding Documentary of the Year. In 2016, Sampson also acted a small part as Provost in the Oscar-nominated feature film Lion. In 2018, he won Television Personality of the Year at the GQ Men of the Year Awards. Sampson is an adventurer and has climbed to the summit of Mount Everest.

Early life and education 
Sampson was born in Sydney, Nova Scotia, Canada. He left Cape Breton at age 16, completing his schooling at the Pearson United World College of the Pacific, to which he won a $30,000 scholarship. He then studied economics and biology at Queen's University in Ontario, working as a college counselor to supplement his income. He applied for another international scholarship and went on to complete an M.B.A. at the University of Cape Town.

Business career 
Sampson started in advertising at the Cape Town agency The White House. In the mid-1990s, he worked as a strategist at Australian company The Campaign Palace. He joined Leo Burnett Sydney in 2002 and was later appointed CEO of Leo Burnett Australia. In August 2015, Sampson stepped back to the role of non-executive chairman. In December 2016, he resigned as chair of Leo Burnett and is no longer a part of the advertising industry.

He is the co-creator of the Earth Hour initiative, one of the largest environmental movements in history, reaching more than 1.4 billion people in more than 5,500 cities.

In 2014, Sampson was appointed to the board of directors of Fairfax Media, a 2.5-billion-dollar multi-platform media company in Australasia. Effective February 2015, Sampson joined the Qantas board of directors as a non-executive director.

Sampson is an adventurer, having completed an unguided ascent to the top of Mount Everest.

Television career 
Sampson is a regular panellist on the ABC television media review program Gruen. He sometimes appears as a panellist and guest host on Network Ten's The Project.

In October 2013, he was the subject of a science documentary series, Redesign My Brain. The documentary won the 2014 AACTA Award for Best Documentary Television Program. Sampson has also written and hosted an adventure science series for Discovery International and Network 10 called Todd Sampson's Body Hack. Body Hack was nominated for two Logie Awards - Best Factual Series and Most Outstanding Documentary Series. Sampson also acted a small part as Provost in the Oscar-nominated feature film Lion.  In early 2017, Sampson hosted an ABC Science documentary called Life on the Line.

In 2021, the two-part documentary series Mirror, Mirror, created and written by Samspon, screened on Network Ten.  The documentary explored the crisis of body image dissatisfaction in society and the manipulative trillion-dollar industry that profits from it. A second season explores how the internet is changing society and what people can do about it.

Awards 
The Australian Financial Review and News Limited ranked him as one of the most influential executives in Australia. He has won a CEO of the Year Award twice and has featured on the cover of BRW magazine. He was ranked as one of the most influential men under 45 by Men's Style and was nominated for GQ's Man of the Year Award.

An art piece by Michelle St Anne called I Love Todd Sampson – Voices of the Vulnerable was performed at Walsh Bay in February and March 2013.

References

External links
 

 
1970 births
People educated at a United World College
Australian television personalities
Australian chief executives
Australian people of Canadian descent
Australian summiters of Mount Everest
Canadian emigrants to Australia
Canadian television personalities
Canadian chief executives
Living people
People from Sydney, Nova Scotia